Gregariella is a genus of mussels in the family Mytilidae.

Selected species
 Gregariella australis (E. von Martens, 1879)
 Gregariella bakeri (Dall, Bartsch & Rehder, 1938)
 Gregariella barbata (Reeve, 1858)
 Gregariella chenui (Récluz, 1842)
 Gregariella coarctata (Carpenter, 1857)
 Gregariella coralliophaga (Gmelin, 1791) — artist's mussel
 Gregariella denticulata (Dall, 1871)
 Gregariella difficilis (Deshayes, 1863)
 Gregariella ehrenbergi (Issel, 1869)
 Gregariella fischeri (E. A. Smith, 1885)
 Gregariella multistriata (E. A. Smith, 1872)
 Gregariella nubilis (Iredale, 1937)
 Gregariella obermulleri (Fischer-Piette & Nicklès, 1946)
 Gregariella petagnae (Scacchi, 1832)
 Gregariella semigranata (Reeve, 1858)
 Gregariella splendida (Reeve, 1858)
 Gregariella vignoni (Petit de la Saussaye, 1862)

References

 Valentich-Scott P., Coan E.V. & Zelaya D. (2020). Bivalve seashells of western North America. Marine bivalve mollusks from Punta Aguja, Peru to Isla Chiloé, Chile. vii + 593 pp. Santa Barbara: Santa Barbara Museum of Natural History.
 Coan, E. V.; Valentich-Scott, P. (2012). Bivalve seashells of tropical West America. Marine bivalve mollusks from Baja California to northern Peru. 2 vols, 1258 pp.

External links
-  Monterosato T. A. (di) (1883-1885). Conchiglie littorali mediterranee. Naturalista Siciliano, Palermo, 3(3): 87-91 (1883); 3(4): 102-111; 3(5): 137-140; 3(6): 159-163; 3(8): 227-231; 3(10): 277-281; 4(1-2): 21-25; 4(3): 60-63 (1884); 4(4): 80-84; 4(8): 200-204 (1885)
 Crosse H. (1885). Nomenclatura generica e specifica di alcune conchiglie mediterranee, pel Marchese di Monterosato [book review. Journal de Conchyliologie 33: 139-142]

Mytilidae
Bivalve genera